De Camp, or DeCamp, or Decamp is a surname. Notable people with the surname include:

Vincent De Camp (1777-1839), British stage actor
L. Sprague de Camp (1907–2000), American science fiction and fantasy writer
Catherine Crook de Camp (1907–2000), American writer, wife of L. Sprague
Caroline Middleton DeCamp (1926–2000), British politician                                                                                                    Joseph DeCamp (1941–2017), state senator and authjoseph DeCamp (1858–1923), American painter
Rosemary DeCamp (1910–2001), American actress
C. M. DeCamp, national champion college football player

See also
DeCamp, California, community in Mendocino County
De Camp, Missouri, a ghost town
DeCamp Bus Lines, bus company serving northern New Jersey
Camp (surname)